Sci-Fighters is a 1996 science fiction action film directed by Peter Svatek and starring Roddy Piper, Billy Drago and Jayne Heitmeyer.

Plot summary
The film takes place in the city of Boston, in the year 2009. Detective Cameron Grayson (Roddy Piper) is on the trail of Adrian Dunn (Billy Drago), his ex-partner and his wife's murderer. Dunn has escaped from prison on the Moon and returned to Earth with a deadly alien virus. Grayson must hurry to stop Dunn before the virus Dunn is carrying spreads all over the planet.

Cast
 Roddy Piper as Detective Cameron Grayson
 Billy Drago as Adrian Dunn
 Jayne Heitmeyer as Dr. Kirbie Younger
 Tyrone Benskin as Dr. Gene Washington
 Chip Chuipka as Captain Lankett
 Jesse Evans as Ned Raver
 Richard Raybourne as Casper
 Andy Bradshaw as G.T.
 Richard Zeman as Desine
 Alain Gabriel as Rollo
 Philip Pretten as Dr. Underwood
 Johni Keyworth as The Mayor
 Donna Sarrasin as Tricia Rollins
 Karen Elkin as Zombie Woman
 Danielle Desormeaux as Female Officer
 Doris Milmore as Hooker

External links 
 

1996 films
Canadian science fiction action films
Canadian action thriller films
1990s science fiction action films
English-language Canadian films
1996 action thriller films
Films set in the future
Films set in 2009
Films set in Boston
CineTel Films films
Films directed by Peter Svatek
1990s English-language films
1990s Canadian films